Crombrugghia tristis is a moth of the family Pterophoridae. It is found in most of Europe, except the Benelux, Great Britain, Ireland and Scandinavia. It is also known from southern Siberia, Asia Minor and central Asia. The habitat consists of sandy areas overgrown with Hieracium.

It is greyish, light-brown coloured.

The larvae feed on Hieracium echioides, Hieracium umbeliferum, Hieracium dubium, Hieracium cymosum, Hieracium piloselloides, Hieracium fallax, Hieracium pilosella and Hieracium amplexicaule.

References

Further reading

Oxyptilini
Moths described in 1841
Plume moths of Asia
Plume moths of Europe
Taxa named by Philipp Christoph Zeller